Figure/Ground is an open-source, para-academic, inter-disciplinary website that publishes in-depth interviews with scholars, researchers, and university professors. Artists, filmmakers, and creators of every stripe are also interviewed. Figure/Ground was a finalist in 2012 Canadian Online Publishing Awards and the 2013 Edublog Awards, and received the 2012 New Canadian Weblog Award (education category) as well as the 2013 John Culkin Award for outstanding praxis by the Media Ecology Association.

History
Figure/Ground began as a personal blog, founded by Laureano Ralón in 2009. It claims to contain one of the largest collections of scholarly interviews on the web, with numerous volunteer collaborators ranging from senior undergraduates to PhD candidates.

Mission
According to the About page in the website:

Figure/Ground sits on the edges of the academy and the art world; our aim is to bring the voices of academics and artists out of their specialized domains of practice and give them a venue for speaking frankly to the public at large.
Conversation is one of the most basic forms of human communication, yet the interview is a deeply undervalued genre within academic discourse. The majority of peer-reviewed journals in the humanities and social sciences publish mostly essays and book reviews. In an age of digital interactive media, we believe the interview genre can serve as a powerful pedagogic tool and as a primary source for the production of new knowledge.

References

External links
Figure/Ground

Creative Commons-licensed websites
Internet properties established in 2009
Art websites
Interviews
Educational websites